Paree, Paree is a 1934 black-and-white Vitaphone musical short starring Bob Hope and Dorothy Stone. Cole Porter  wrote the lyrics and music for this musical comedy short.

Premise 
A wealthy man (Bob Hope) makes a bet with his friends that he could win a girl (Dorothy Stone) without her knowing of his riches.

Cast 
Bob Hope as Peter Forbes 
Dorothy Stone as Lulu Carroll  
Billie Leonard as Violet 
Rodney McLennan as Michael Cummings (credited as Rodney McLennon) 
Charles Collins as Baxter 
Charles La Torre as Flower Vendor

Songs 
Four of the songs in this short were first used in Porter's 1929 Broadway musical Fifty Million Frenchmen, then in the 1931 film adaptation of the same name, which was filmed in Technicolor.

"Paree, What Did You Do to Me" – Female singer
"You Don't Know Paree" – Orchestra
"You Do Something to Me" – Peter and Lulu
"Find Me a Primitive Man"  – Violet
"You've Got That Thing" – Peter
Finale: "You've Got That Thing" (reprise) – Company

These songs were from Fifty Million Frenchmen.

Home media
This short was released on DVD in the special features of the MGM movie musical Silk Stockings (1957).

References

External links
Paree, Paree at IMDB

1934 films
Warner Bros. short films
Vitaphone short films
American musical comedy films
1934 musical comedy films
Films directed by Roy Mack
Films produced by Samuel Sax
American black-and-white films
1930s American films